Laxmirani Majhi (born 26 January 1989) is an Indian female right handed recurve archer.

Early life 

Laxmi is from the Santhal tribe; she grew up in Bagula village in East Singhbhum district, Jharkhand. Her first chance to become an archer was offered to her when the selectors for the archery academy visited her Government School. Laxmi work with Indian Railways in Bilaspur, Chhattisgarh

Achievements 

She competed in the individual recurve event and the 2015 World Archery Championships – 
She also finished 4th in the Individual Event, losing out on the Bronze Medal. In Women's Team Recurve event, she won the silver medal at the 2015 World Archery Championships in Copenhagen, Denmark.

She was the part of the team that qualified for 2016 Rio Olympics. The Indian women's recurve team, consisting of Laxmirani Majhi, Bombayla Devi Laishram and Deepika Kumari, finished 7th in the ranking round. The team won their match against Colombia in the round of 16 before losing the quarterfinal match against Russia.

In the individual event, she ranked 43rd in the ranking round. She then lost to Alexandra Longová of Slovakia in the round of 64.

References

External links
 
 
 

Indian female archers
Living people
Place of birth missing (living people)
1989 births
Sportswomen from Jharkhand
Archers at the 2014 Asian Games
World Archery Championships medalists
People from Asansol
People from East Singhbhum district
Olympic archers of India
Archers at the 2016 Summer Olympics
21st-century Indian women
21st-century Indian people
Archers from Jharkhand
Archers at the 2018 Asian Games
Asian Games competitors for India